Mariza is the sixth studio album by fado singer Mariza. It was released in 2015 by Warner Music Portugal. The album peaked at No. 1 on the Associação Fonográfica Portuguesa chart and was certified as a double platinum album. It also reached No. 13 on US World chart. The album received a Latin Grammy nomination for Best Portuguese Language Contemporary Pop Album in 2016.

Track listing
 Rio de Mágoa (Rosa Lobato de Faria, Mario Pacheco) [3:17]
 Melhor de Mim (AC Firmino, Tiago Machado) [4:08]
 Alma (Javier Limón) [3:12]
 Saudade Solta (Luís José Martins, Pedro Da Silva Martins) [3:32]
 Sem Ti (Miguel Gameiro) [5:00]
 Maldição (Fado Cravo, Alfredo Marceneiro, Armando Vieira Pinto) [4:48]
 Padoce de Céu Azul [3:51]
 Caprichosa (Froilán Aguilar) [2:37]
 Paixão (Jorge Fernando) [3:01]
 Anda o Sol na Minha Rua (David Mourão Ferreira, Fontes Rocha) [2:27]
 Adeus (Pedro Jóia, Cabral Do Nascimento) [2:57]
 Missangas (Paulo de Carvalho, Paulo Abreu Lima) [3:39]
 Sombra (Jorge Fernando) [3:51]
 Meu Amor Pequenino (Paulo Abreu Lima, Rui Veloso) [2:29]

References

Mariza albums
2015 albums
Portuguese-language albums
Warner Music Group albums